Martin von Baumgarten was a German explorer who wrote the book Peregrinatio in Aegyptum, Arabiam, Palaestinam, & Syriam, published in 1594. It was the first modern account of the ruins at Baalbek and was mentioned by John Locke.

References

Citations

Bibliography
 . 

Explorers of Arabia
16th-century German writers
16th-century German male writers